Zegalerus is a genus of small to medium-sized sea snails, marine gastropod molluscs in the family Calyptraeidae, commonly known as slipper snails, cup-and-saucer shells, and Chinese hat shells.

This genus has been declared a synonym of the genus Sigapatella Lesson, 1831

Species
Species within the genus Zegalerus include:
 Zegalerus coniculus  

Species brought into synonymy
 Zegalerus crater Finlay, 1927; synonym of Sigapatella novaezelandiae Lesson, 1830
 † Zegalerus giganteus Beu, 1970: synonym of † Sigapatella gigantea (Beu, 1970) 
 † Zegalerus peramplus: synonym of  †Sigapatella perampla (Powell & Bartrum, 1929)  
 Zegalerus terraenovae (Peile, 1924): synonym of Sigapatella terraenovae (Peile, 1924)
 Zegalerus tenuis (Gray, 1867): synonym of Sigapatella tenuis (Gray, 1867)
Species inquerenda
 Zegalerus tumens Finlay, 1930: synonym of Sigapatella terraenovae Peile, 1924

References

 Powell A. W. B., New Zealand Mollusca, William Collins Publishers Ltd, Auckland, New Zealand 1979

External links
 DiscoverLife
 ZipCodeZoo

Calyptraeidae
Taxa named by Harold John Finlay